The 1997 FIBA Under-19 World Championship for Women (Portuguese: Campeonato Mundial Feminino Sub-19 da Fiba 1997) took place in Brazil from 5 to 13 July 1997. It was co-organised by the International Basketball Federation (FIBA) and Brazilian Basketball Confederation.

Twelve national teams competed for the championship. United States came away with the Gold medal by defeating Australia 78–74 in the final.

Venues
Natal

Competing nations

Except Brazil, which automatically qualified as the host nation, the 11 remaining countries qualified through their continents’ qualifying tournaments:

FIBA Africa (1)
 
FIBA Asia (2)
 
 

FIBA Americas (4)
  (Host)
 
 
 
FIBA Oceania (1)
 

FIBA Europe (4)

Preliminary round

Group A

Group B

Knockout stage

Bracket

5th place bracket

9th place bracket

Classification 9–12

Classification 5–8

Semifinals

Eleventh place game

Ninth place game

Seventh place game

Fifth place game

Third place game

Final

Final standings

Awards

References

External links
 Official Web of 1997 FIBA World Championship for Junior Women.

FIBA Under-19 Women's Basketball World Cup
World Championship for Women
1997 in Brazilian sport
International women's basketball competitions hosted by Brazil
1997 in Brazilian women's sport